Dimitris Kallivokas (born 30 July 1930) is a Greek actor. He appeared in more than seventy films since 1958.

Selected filmography

References

External links 

1930 births
Living people
Greek male film actors
Male actors from Athens